CareCloud, Inc. (formerly MTBC) is a publicly traded American healthcare information technology company that provides services, to healthcare providers and hospitals. The Company maintains its headquarters in Somerset, New Jersey, and employs approximately 4,000 workers worldwide.

CareCloud’s common stock trades on the Nasdaq Global Market under the ticker symbol “MTBC,” and its Series A (11%) and Series B (8.75%) Preferred Stocks trade on the Nasdaq Global Market under the ticker symbols “MTBCP” and “MTBCO.”

History 
CareCloud was founded as Medical Transcription Billing Corporation (MTBC) in 1999 by American entrepreneur Mahmud Haq. The earliest days of the company were focused on providing transcription and manual medical billing to healthcare providers primarily located in New Jersey.

In 2004, the company developed a fully integrated suite of services that includes a proprietary practice management platform, ONC-ACB, meaningful use stage 2 certified complete electronic health records software and a revenue cycle management service.

On June 6, 2013, former ambassador to Pakistan Cameron Munter joined MTBC's Board of Directors.

On July 23, 2014, the company went public on NASDAQ Capital Market under the ticker symbol "MTBC." The preferred stock trades under “MTBCP.”

In 2017, the company launched talkEHR, the industry’s first voice-enabled electronic health record.

In 2019, they changed the corporation name from Medical Transcription Billing Corp. to MTBC, Inc.

In 2021, they changed the corporation name to CareCloud, Inc.

The company also has operations in Pakistan and Sri Lanka.

Acquisitions 
Post-IPO, the company (as MTBC) made 16 acquisitions including revenue cycle management and healthcare IT companies in the United States. Some of the key acquisitions include Gulf Coast Billing (2016), Renaissance Physician Services (2016), MediGain (2016), Orion (2018).

In 2020, CareCloud (formerly MTBC) made two major acquisitions of healthcare technology companies; CareCloud Corporation and Meridian Medical Management for reportedly up to $40M and $24.8M, respectively.

Products and Services 
CareCloud offers Software-as-a-Service (or SaaS) platform that includes revenue cycle management (RCM), business intelligence, telehealth, practice management (PM) electronic health record (EHR), patient experience management (PXM), Robotic Process Automation (RPA), and solutions for high-performance medical groups.

Awards 
In 2020, CareCloud (as MTBC) was awarded public company of the year by TechUnited New Jersey. In years 2009-2012 and 2016, the company was included in the Deloitte Technology Fast 500 list as a fastest growing US tech company. In years 2010-2013, they were included in the Inc. 5000 as a fastest growing US company. In 2012, CareCloud was nominated for the US Secretary of State's Award for Corporate Excellence. In 2015, they were ranked as a Top 50 EHR software company by Medical Economics.

References

Companies listed on the Nasdaq
Health care companies based in New Jersey
Electronic health record software companies